Heikant is a hamlet in the municipality of Oisterwijk, in the Dutch province of North Brabant. It is located about 4 km east of Moergestel.

References

Populated places in North Brabant
Oisterwijk